Wi-Fi microcontrollers enable Wi-Fi connectivity for devices so that they can send & receive data and accept commands. As such, Wi-Fi microcontrollers can be used for bringing otherwise ordinary devices into the realm of the Internet of things.

Wi-Fi microcontroller chips:

References

External links
Texas Instruments Wi-Fi MCU product selector
Cypress Wireless MCU products

.
L
Wi-Fi microcontrollers
Digital electronics
Internet of things